Marius is a 2013 film adaptation of the play of the same name by Marcel Pagnol. It stars Raphaël Personnaz, Daniel Auteuil, Victoire Bélézy, Marie-Anne Chazel, Jean-Pierre Darroussin, Daniel Russo, Rufus and Nicolas Vaude. Auteuil also directed and wrote the screenplay.

Cast 
 Daniel Auteuil as César 
 Raphaël Personnaz as Marius 
 Jean-Pierre Darroussin as Panisse
 Victoire Bélézy as Fanny
 Marie-Anne Chazel as Honorine
 Nicolas Vaude as Monsieur Brun
 Daniel Russo as Escartefigue
 Rufus as Piquoiseau
 Jean-Louis Barcelona as Frisepoulet
 Martine Diotalevi as Madame Escartefigue

Critical response
On the review aggregator website Rotten Tomatoes, the film has an approval rating of 50%, based on ten reviews, with an average rating of 5.38/10. On Metacritic, the film has a weighted average score of 50 out of 100, based on 8 critics, indicating "mixed or average reviews".

Accolades

References

External links

French romantic drama films
2010s French-language films
French films based on plays
Films based on works by Marcel Pagnol
2013 romantic drama films
2013 films
Remakes of French films
Pathé films
Films scored by Alexandre Desplat
Films directed by Daniel Auteuil
2010s French films